"The Jimmy" is the 105th episode of the NBC sitcom Seinfeld. This is the 19th episode for the sixth season. It originally aired on March 16, 1995. The episode's title refers to guest character Jimmy (played by Anthony Starke), who transmits his habit of referring to himself in the third person to regular characters George and Elaine. In other plot threads of the episode, Jerry becomes suspicious of the goings-on at Tim Whatley's dental office, and Kramer is mistaken for a mentally challenged person, leading him to be a guest of honor with Mel Tormé, who appears in the episode as himself.

Plot
Jerry, George and Kramer play a game of basketball with Jimmy, a man who always refers to himself in the third person. Jimmy wears and sells special training shoes which improve vertical leap. George partners with him on selling the shoes, using Jimmy as the spokesmodel. At a New York Yankees meeting Mr. Wilhelm discusses a series of escalating thefts, believed to be an inside job. George is sweating heavily as a result of exercising, causing him to look suspicious. At a dental appointment with Dr. Tim Whatley, Jerry sees Penthouse magazines in the waiting room, and learns that the office has a new "adults-only policy".

Elaine has tickets to a benefit for the Able Mentally Challenged Adults (AMCA) featuring famous crooner Mel Tormé, and contemplates asking out a blond guy from her health club. At the health club she ends up talking with Jimmy, and agrees to a date with him, not realizing that by "Jimmy" he means himself and not the blond man.

At the health club, because of novocaine he was given for dental surgery by Dr. Tim Whatley, Kramer speaks awkwardly and drools water on the floor. Jimmy slips in the puddle, injuring his leg, and promises revenge. Without Jimmy, George fails to demonstrate the value of the training shoes to employees at a sneaker store, as his vertical leap is embarrassingly short. Kramer shares a taxicab with an executive at the AMCA, who mistakes him for a mentally challenged adult due to his novocaine-induced condition and training shoes, and invites him to the event as the guest of honor. Jerry and Elaine recognize the misunderstanding but are not overly concerned that Kramer's cover will be blown.

At a second appointment with Dr. Whatley, Jerry is put to sleep with nitrous oxide. Whatley tells Jerry that his regular assistant Jennifer is at Dr. Sussman's office and has been replaced by Cheryl, because "we find it fun to swap now and then." When Jerry wakes, he sees Whatley and Cheryl adjusting their clothes and fears he was sexually violated while asleep. Kramer later picks up a copy of Penthouse and reads an anonymous letter from a dentist who says he recently "had a little fun" with his dental hygienist and one of his patients. Jerry looks on in shock.

George eats Kung Pao chicken for lunch, making him sweat again. Mr. Wilhelm walks in while he is on the phone with Sports Wholesalers talking about "beautiful athletic gear" (the shoes). Along with the sweat, Wilhelm becomes convinced George stole the equipment and reports him to the team owner, George Steinbrenner. The stress makes George starts talking in the third person; this confuses Steinbrenner, who ends up talking about his lunch and completely forgetting about the stolen equipment.

After Jerry tells Elaine about Jimmy referring to himself in the third person, she realizes her mistake. However, finding Jimmy's manner of speech charming, and additionally learning that the man she was initially interested in is gay, she decides to keep the date. At the benefit, Jimmy attacks Kramer, slugging him in the face before being dragged out by security. Kramer's lip becomes swollen and he once again looks and speaks as if he were mentally challenged. Mel Tormé dedicates a rendition of "When You're Smiling" to a beaming Kramer.

Production
A crew member gave guest star Bryan Cranston the idea of Dr. Whatley taking a hit of the nitrous oxide before giving it to Jerry. Casting for Whatley's two hygienists specifically called for actresses with experience in nude modeling, to add realism to a (deleted before broadcast) scene in which Kramer and Jerry recognize one of the hygienists in a nude photo in Penthouse.

Mel Tormé's performance of "When You're Smiling" was done in a single take before a live studio audience. Tormé's acting in the episode was so convincing that many who watched it, including Jason Alexander (who plays George), suspected that Tormé had not been fully briefed on the plot and was under the mistaken impression that Kramer actor Michael Richards really was mentally challenged. In actuality, Tormé and Richards were already acquainted with each other before filming the episode.

The episode features the first appearance of Richard Herd as Mr. Wilhelm.

References

External links
Official Seinfeld Website

Seinfeld (season 6) episodes
1995 American television episodes
Fictional illeists